The Investigators is an American dramatic television series starring James Franciscus and James Philbrook about a team of insurance investigators in New York City. Original episodes aired from October 5 to December 28, 1961, on CBS.

Synopsis

Investigators Inc. is a very successful private investigation firm with offices on Manhattan′s stylish Upper East Side in New York City. The firm specializes in investigating very large insurance claims to root out cases of insurance fraud. Russ Andrews and Steve Banks run the firm, Bill Davis and Danny Clayton are the among the firm's investigators, and Maggie Peters serves not only as their girl Friday, but also as an investigator in her own right who sometimes goes undercover during an investigation. Polly Walters is the secretary at the office. As the team investigates the legitimacy of insurance claims, they become involved with criminals, the police, and others.

Cast
James Franciscus....Russ Andrews
James Philbrook....Steve Banks
Mary Murphy....Maggie Peters
Al Austin....Bill Davis
Asher Dann....Danny Clayton
June Kenny....Polly Walters

Broadcast history

The Investigators premiered on CBS on October 5, 1961, airing on Thursdays at 9:00 p.m. throughout its 13-episode run. CBS cancelled it after only half a season, and its last original episode aired on December 28, 1961.

Episodes
Sources:

References

CBS original programming
1960s American drama television series
1961 American television series debuts
1961 American television series endings
Television shows set in New York City